Ryan John Giles (born 26 January 2000) is an English professional footballer who plays as a left wing back for Middlesbrough on loan from Wolverhampton Wanderers.

Club career
Giles was born in Telford, Shropshire, grew up in St George's and attended Wrockwardine Wood School. He progressed through Wolverhampton Wanderers' youth system, winning the Academy Player of the Year Award for the 2017–18 season.

The midfielder was one of a group of young players taken on a pre-season tour with the first team in summer 2018. He was an unused substitute in several EFL Cup ties before signing a four-year contract with the club which will keep him at Wolves until summer 2022.

On 24 March 2018 he was loaned to his hometown club AFC Telford United in the National League North for the rest of the season, being signed by his future Wolves under-23 coach Rob Edwards. He made his debut the same day in a goalless home draw with Darlington as an 82nd-minute substitute for Jordan Lussey. He totalled nine appearances and provided seven assists as the Bucks avoided relegation, and he scored in home and away wins against Spennymoor Town in April.

He made his Wolves debut on 26 January 2019, his 19th birthday in an FA Cup fourth round tie away at Shrewsbury Town. The match ended as a 2–2 draw.

On 1 July 2019, Giles temporarily located back to Shropshire once again, signing for League One side Shrewsbury Town on a planned season-long loan. On his debut on 3 August, he scored the only goal of a home win in the season opener against Portsmouth. On 17 January 2020, he was recalled by his parent club due to injury to Wolves' Rúben Vinagre.

Giles returned to League One on January deadline day 2020, joining Coventry City on loan for the rest of the 2019–20 season. He made his only appearance on 25 February in a 1–1 home draw with Rotherham United, as a last-minute substitute for Sam McCallum. The season was curtailed due to the COVID-19 pandemic, with Coventry promoted as champions. 

On 25 January 2021, he was recalled by Wolverhampton, and loaned the next day to Rotherham United until the end of the season. He made his debut for them on 27 January, away at Middlesbrough. Coming on in the 88th minute, he scored in stoppage time to complete a 3–0 win.

On 13th July 2021, it was announced that he had signed on loan to Cardiff City on loan for the 2021–22 season. On 3 January 2022, Giles was recalled by his parent club and left Cardiff. At the time of his recall, Giles had registered nine assists, a tally that could not be bettered in the Championship.

On 31 January 2022, Giles joined EFL Championship side Blackburn Rovers on loan for the remainder of the 2021–22 season.

On 23 June 2022, Giles joined Middlesbrough on loan for the duration of the 2022–23 season.

International career
In August 2019, Giles received his first England call-up, for under-20 matches against the Netherlands and Switzerland in the following month. He made his debut on 5 September in a goalless draw with the Dutch, starting the match at his club ground, the New Meadow.

Career statistics

References

External links

2000 births
Living people
English footballers
Wolverhampton Wanderers F.C. players
Association football midfielders
People from Telford
National League (English football) players
Shrewsbury Town F.C. players
AFC Telford United players
Coventry City F.C. players
Rotherham United F.C. players
Cardiff City F.C. players
Blackburn Rovers F.C. players
Middlesbrough F.C. players
English Football League players
England youth international footballers